What the Romans Did for Us, is a 2000 BBC documentary series "looking at the innovations and inventions brought to Britain by the Romans". The title of the programme is derived from the cult film Monty Python's Life of Brian, referencing the famous scene where the People's Front of Judea discuss (itself based on a Mishnaic discourse by Rabbi Shimon) "What have the Romans done for us?"

Production
In 2003, the series was re-edited into 10-minute sections for broadcast as programme fillers.

Reception

Awards
Nominated for Best Feature at the British Academy Television Awards 2001.

Episodes

Episode one: Life of Luxury

 Roman villas, such as Littlecote Roman Villa visited by Hart-Davis, had elaborate mosaics and ornate gardens.
 The screw press, reconstructed using traditional techniques by carpenter Henry Russell, was used to produce wine.
 Aqueducts, such as the one near Dorchester visited by Hart-Davis, exemplified the Roman's mastery of hydraulic engineering.
 Hypocausts, like the replica visited by Hart Davis, was the heart of Thermae, such as those in Bath, Somerset visited by Hart-Davis.
 Cooking implements, demonstrated by food historian and chef Sally Grainger, were used to create 3-course Roman meals.

Episode two: Invasion

 Galleys with banks of rowers, simple sails and twin steering oars brought over 40,000 troops that landed at Richborough.
 Legionaries and cavalrymen with superior armour, battle formations, field weapons, and even elephants swept to victory.
 Pre-fabricated forts, such as the reconstruction at Lunt visited by Hart-Davis, secured the victory and exemplified their engineering skills.
 Roman artillery such as the Onager and the Ballista secured victory at Maiden Castle and Hodd Hill visited by Hart-Davis.
 Pharos, such as the one visited by Hart-Davis, guided Roman supply vessels into the great port at Dover.

Episode three: Building Britain

 Intensive farming methods introduced by the Romans included the introduction of new crops, the draining of marshes, and iron ploughs.
 Trade and commerce settlements alongside the military camps grew into grid-patterned walled towns such as York visited by Hart-Davis.
 Sewers, high-rise apartments, street lighting and glass windows were all features of Roman towns and cities.
 Cafes and snack bars provided the Romans with fast food takeaways including pies, pastries, sausages and even hamburgers.
 Fire brigades and primitive fire extinguishers, demonstrated by Hart-Davis, were developed under the auspices of the Emperor Nero.

Episode four: Arteries of the Empire

 Groma surveying, demonstrated by Hart-Davis, allowed the surveying of perfectly straight roads such as Watling Street and Stane Street.
 The construction of Roman roads, demonstrated by Hart Davis, has allowed them to endure to this day.
 Vitruvius's odometer, demonstrated by Hart-Davis, were used for the accurate measurement and placing of milestones.
 Roman merchants introduced mass-produced pottery, glassware, amber jewellery, metal ware and amphora of wine and olive oil.
 Gold was mined with revolutionary engineering, in places like Dolaucothi Gold Mines visited by Hart-Davis, for use in trade.

Episode five: Edge of Empire

 Hadrian's Wall marked the northern boundary of the Roman Empire, and had defensive features such as milecastles and forts such as Housesteads.
 At supply depots such as Arbeia, Romans baked bread in open fires.
 Roman soldiers used rounded stones as defensive weapons, and blacksmiths made arrowheads and other items out of iron.
 Many documents have been discovered at Vindolanda fort, such as postcards made out of thin wood veneer.
 Wax tablets were used for making temporary notes.
 Flagged beacons were used to send messages between forts, milecastles, and watchtowers.
 Pre-determined messages were also sent using identical water-clocks, and signalling using fire.

Episode six: Ahead of Their Time

 The occupying Romans kept their people occupied with food and entertainment, or "bread and circuses".
 Gladiators performing in amphitheatres would use a coin-operated water dispenser for cleansing as part of their pre-fight rituals.
 Romans built automata driven by a weight sitting on a container of sand that was slowly allowed to empty.
 Builders made mortar out of chalk and sand, and added volcanic ash to make quick-setting concrete. This was used to make arched and domed structures.
 An anonymous work, De Rebus Bellicis, featured various war machines, such as an inflatable bridge made out of animal skins.
 Eventually, the Roman empire simply became too large and indefensible, and the troops were gradually withdrawn from Britain. Although some technologies were then lost, we still retain some to this day.

References

External links 
 
 

2000 British television series debuts
2000 British television series endings
2000s British documentary television series
2000s British television miniseries
BBC television documentaries about prehistoric and ancient history
English-language television shows